Nyêmo is a township of  Nyêmo County in the Lhasa Prefecture of the Tibet Autonomous Region of China.  It is located 94 kilometres south-west of Lhasa.

See also
List of towns and villages in Tibet

External links
Wikimapia

Populated places in Lhasa (prefecture-level city)
Township-level divisions of Tibet
Nyêmo County